The South Amboy Fire Clay Group is a geologic group in New Jersey. It preserves fossils dating back to the Cretaceous period.

See also

 List of fossiliferous stratigraphic units in New Jersey
 Paleontology in New Jersey

References
 

Geologic groups of New Jersey